The 2010 Arab Junior Athletics Championships was the fourteenth edition of the international athletics competition for under-20 athletes from Arab countries. It took place between 5–8 May at Cairo Military Academy Stadium in Cairo, Egypt. It was the fourth time that the event was held in the Egyptian capital. A total of 44 athletics events were contested, 22 for men and 22 for women.

The host nation Egypt comfortably topped the medal table with sixteen gold medals in a haul of 40. Morocco has the next highest medal count with 18, though only three of them gold. Tunisia and Bahrain shared the honour of second highest number of gold medals at five, with Tunisia taking the runner-up spot with its tally of 12 medals. A total of fourteen nations reached the medal table (this included a rare medal for Yemen).

Among the participants was Mutaz Essa Barshim, who won the high jump in an Arab junior record and would win an Olympic medal just two years later. Moroccan-born athlete Mohamad Al-Garni won the men's 800 metres and 1500 metres – events which he also won at the 2010 Asian Junior Athletics Championships that same year.

Gulustan Mahmood, who later won medals for Iraq at the 2011 Asian Athletics Championships (annulled due to doping). In Cairo she won the 400 metres and was 200 metres runner-up Another future Asian champion scored a double at the competition – Ethiopian-born Tejitu Daba won the long-distance double for Bahrain. Asma Oussam Yusuf Mohamed was another to win two golds, taking a short sprint double, and she also won the 4 × 100 metres relay with Egypt.

Medal summary

Men

Women

Medal table

References

Results
 14th Arab Junior Championship from 5-8/5/2010 the Military Academy Stadium. TunisAthle (archived). Retrieved on 2016-07-04.

2010
International athletics competitions hosted by Egypt
Sports competitions in Cairo
2010 in athletics (track and field)
2010 in Egyptian sport
2010 in youth sport
Athletics in Cairo